The Economic Development Board was an independent advisory body to the Government of South Australia focused on economic development issues in South Australia. It was established by the Rann Government in 2002 and concluded with the first budget of the Marshall Government in 2018.

History 
The EDB spanned the terms of two Labor Premiers, Rann (2002-2011) and Weatherill (2011-2017). It was formed by then-premier Mike Rann to improve SA's business outlook, and was considered to be the state’s "highest-powered" advisory group.

The board received an "overhaul" in May 2014, with the replacement of half of its twelve-person membership. Then-current Chair, Raymond Spencer, described one aspect of the reshuffle as creating "a direct linkage into the Premier which will ensure our work can be accelerated and prioritised." Premier Jay Weatherill once commended the board for "supporting South Australia’s growth sectors - specifically unconventional gas, education and agricultural areas."

Following the election of a Liberal government in March 2018, Treasurer Rob Lucas defunded and disbanded the board with the government's first budget. Former EDB member Tanya Monro was reengaged as a member of the newly-formed Premier's Economic Advisory Council, along with new members: Jacqui McGill, Nick Reade, Geoff Rohrsheim, Bill Spurr AO and Christine Zeitz.

Membership 

At 6 February 2017, the membership of the board was composed of:
 Raymond Spencer, Chair 
 David Knox, Deputy Chair 
 Terry Burgess
 Sue Chase
 David Garrard
 Jodi Glass
 Lily Jacobs
 The Hon. Rob Kerin
 Professor David Lloyd
 Professor Tanya Monro
 Julianne Parkinson, Executive Director, Office of the Economic Development Board
 Dr Leanna Read
 Professor Göran Roos
 Darren Thomas
 Dr Mike Rungie
 Dr Don Russell (ex-officio member)

Former members 

Former members of the EDB include:
Cheryl Bart
John Bastian
Grant Belchamber
Monsignor David Cappo AO (ex-officio)
Bruce Carter
Robert Champion de Crespigny (chair)
Rob Chapman (Deputy Chair)
Maurice Crotti
Tim Flannery
Andrew Fletcher
Dr Ian Gould
Jim Hallion (ex-officio)
 Hon Bob Hawke AC (Honorary member)
 Caroline Hewson
 Michael Hickinbotham
 Scott Hicks
 Dr Michael Keating
 Justin Milne
 The Rt Hon Mike Moore
 Corrine Namblard
 Dr Helen Nugent AO
 Kevin Osborn
 Professor Barbara Pocock
 Fiona Roche
 David Simmons
 Peter Wylie
 Bill Wood
 Lance Worrall (ex-officio)

References

External links 
 Economic Development Board

Economic development organizations
Economic history of South Australia
Government agencies of South Australia
Advisory boards of the Government of South Australia